Quorn Hall is a grade II listed country house in the village of Quorn, Leicestershire.

It is a three-storey brick built house originally constructed circa 1680 but later much modified. It is situated on the east side of the village of Quorn in 12 acres of land through which runs the River Soar.

History
Quorn Hall was originally built by John Farnham on land he had acquired by the River Soar in the middle of the 15th century and was originally known as "Nether Hall". Much of the land was subsequently disposed of by his descendants until the estate passed out of the hands of the Farnham family in 1686.

In 1773 the estate was bought by Hugo Meynell, who transferred the pack of foxhounds he already owned to Nether Hall. He renamed the hall as  Quorn Hall and the pack of foxhounds as the Quorn Hunt. The hall and its hounds subsequently passed through the ownership of several wealthy men until 1855, when it was bought by Sir Richard Sutton, who lived in the hall but rented out the stables and kennels. In 1906 the hunt left the Hall for newer premises in nearby Barrow upon Soar. After a short spell as a country club the hall was requisitioned during World War II for training naval personnel. For this purpose the building was considerably enlarged by extending a wing and adding a storey.

It has been used since 1983 as an outdoor education centre by Leicestershire County Council. During 2012, the council considered its closure and sale  and decided to close it at the end of that year.

Elsewhere in Quorn is located Quorn House, also a former seat of the Farnham family and more recently owned by Rosemary Conley.

From 2013–present headteacher Christina Church who is related to the footballer John Terry as her cousin has decided to buy the property for her school.

References

Buildings and structures completed in 1680
Houses completed in the 17th century
Country houses in Leicestershire
Grade II listed houses
Grade II listed buildings in Leicestershire
1680 establishments in England